The Antonine Itinerary ( "The Itinerary of the Emperor Antoninus") is a famous itinerarium, a register of the stations and distances along various roads. Seemingly based on official documents, possibly from a survey carried out under Augustus, it describes the roads of the Roman Empire. Owing to the scarcity of other extant records of this type, it is a valuable historical record.

Almost nothing is known of its date or author. Scholars consider it likely that the original edition was prepared at the beginning of the 3rd century. Although it is traditionally ascribed to the patronage of the 2nd-century Antoninus Pius, the oldest extant copy has been assigned to the time of Diocletian and the most likely imperial patron—if the work had one—would have been Caracalla.

Iter Britanniarum 

The British section is known as the Iter Britanniarum, and can be described as the 'road map' of Roman Britain. There are 15 such itineraries in the document applying to different geographic areas.

The itinerary measures distances in Roman miles, where 1,000 Roman paces equals one Roman mile.

Examples 
Below are the original Latin ablative forms for sites along route 13, followed by a translation with a possible (but not necessarily authoritative) name for the modern sites. A transcriber omitted an entry, so that the total number of paces did not equal the sum of paces between locations.

Below are the original Latin names for sites along route 14, followed by a translation with a possible (but not necessarily authoritative) name for the modern sites.

A confounding factor 
De Situ Britanniae (made available , published 1757) was a forgery by Charles Bertram that provided much spurious information on Roman Britain, including "itineraries" that overlapped the legitimate Antonine Itineraries, sometimes with contradicting information. Its authenticity was not seriously challenged until 1845, and it was still cited as an authoritative source until the late nineteenth century. By then, its false data had infected almost every account of ancient British history, and had been adopted into the Ordnance Survey maps, as General Roy and his successors believed it to be a legitimate source of information, on a par with the Antonine Itineraries. While the document is no longer cited since its authenticity became indefensible, its data has not been systematically removed from past and present works.

Some authors, such as Thomas Reynolds, without challenging the authenticity of the forgery, took care to note its discrepancies and challenge the quality of its information. This was not always so, even after the forgery was debunked.

Gonzalo Arias (died 2008) proposed that some of the distance anomalies in the British section of the Antonine Itinerary resulted from the loss of Latin grammatical endings, as these had marked junctions heading towards places, as distinct from the places themselves. However, Arias may not have taken account of earlier work indicating that distances were measured between the edges of administrative areas of named settlements as opposed to centre-to-centre, thereby explaining supposed distance shortfalls and providing additional useful data on the approximate sizes of such areas.

Hispania 

There are 34 routes in the itinerary for the provinces of Hispania.

See also
Roman units

Citations

Bibliography 

The standard modern edition of the Itinerary is in O. Cuntz, Itineraria Romana, vol. 1: Itineraria Antonini Augusti et Burdigalense  (Leipzig 1929), nos, 175 (terrestrial), 7685 (maritime).
The first edition was by Geoffroy Troy: 
Bernd Löhberg, Das 'Itinerarium provinciarum Antonini Augusti'  (2006)

External links 

The Antonine Itinerary: Iter Britanniarum - The British Section
Analysis of the Itinerary
Itinerarium Antonini Augusti (the Balkanic roads) at SOLTDM.COM
Roman Roads in Britain

Geography of England
Geography of Wales
Latin prose texts
Maps
Nerva–Antonine dynasty
Roman itineraries
2nd-century Latin books
Historic maps of the Roman Empire
Geography of Portugal
Geography of Spain